Damien Pommereau (born 12 May 1978) is a French former cyclist, who specialized in track races. He won a bronze medal in the team pursuit at the 2000 UCI Track Cycling World Championships.

Major results

1996
 1st  Madison, National Junior Track Championships
1997
 2nd Points race, National Track Championships
1998
 1st  Team pursuit – Cali, UCI World Cup Classics
1999
 UCI World Cup Classics
1st  Team pursuit – Mexico
2nd  Team pursuit – San Francisco
 1st  Madison, UEC European Track Championships (with Robert Sassone)
 1st  Points race, National Under-23 Track Championships
2000
 1st  Team pursuit, National Track Championships
 3rd  Team pursuit, UCI World Championships
 3rd  Team pursuit – Moscow, UCI World Cup Classics
2001
 1st Overall Individual pursuit, UCI World Cup Classics
1st  Mexico
3rd  Cali
 2nd Individual pursuit, National Track Championships
2002
 6th Overall Circuit des Ardennes International
2004
 3rd Points race, National Track Championships

References

External links

1978 births
Living people
French male cyclists
French track cyclists
People from Villepinte, Seine-Saint-Denis
Sportspeople from Seine-Saint-Denis
Cyclists from Île-de-France